Mister Smith is a term used for male persons whose surname is Smith.

Mister Smith can also mean:

 A placeholder name for a generic person (as Smith is a common English surname) - often exemplified as "John Smith"
 Mr. Smith (album), a hiphop album by rapper LL Cool J
 Mr. Smith (novel), a novel by Louis Bromfield
 Mr Smith (The Sarah Jane Adventures), a fictional extraterrestrial computer in the Doctor Who spinoff The Sarah Jane Adventures
 Mr. Smith (TV series), a short-lived 1983 sitcom, with a talking orangutan as the title character

 Agent Smith, a character in The Matrix, portrayed by Hugo Weaving
 SuitSat, a Russian spacesuit nicknamed Mr. Smith by some
 Mr. Smith, a character from Call of the Wild 
 A pen-name used by Ralph Ingersoll Lockwood
 Mister Smith Entertainment, a British film company

See also
 John Doe
 Mr. & Mrs. Smith (disambiguation)
 Mr. Smith Goes to Washington, a popular film starring James Stewart